"Cornered" is the sixth episode of the fourth season of the American television crime drama series Breaking Bad, and the 39th overall episode of the series. It originally aired on AMC in the United States on August 21, 2011.

Plot 
Another Los Pollos Hermanos truck is raided by the cartel. This time, the two guards in the truck are killed by the truck's exhaust being blown through the vents and the cartel members find the tubs with blue meth.

Skyler White is worried about Walter White, suspecting that he is in danger due to the death of Gale Boetticher. She pleads him to admit he's in danger and turn himself in. Walt reacts angrily, ranting about his importance in the drug trade and implying he killed Gale himself, prompting Skyler to take Holly White and flee the house. She ponders escaping to Colorado at the Four Corners Monument, but ultimately reconsiders.

Walt receives the keys to the car wash from Bogdan Wolynetz, and avenges his past insults by making Bogdan leave behind his framed first earned dollar, which Walt uses to buy a soda. Later, Walt gives into Walter Jr.'s pleas for a new car and buys him a Dodge Challenger.

Walter meets Jesse Pinkman at the lab and questions his frequent errands with Mike Ehrmantraut. Jesse angrily responds that he is finally feeling useful and accuses Walt of discrediting his accomplishments. As they argue, Walt realizes Gus Fring is trying to drive a wedge between them. When they finish cooking, Jesse gets called away by Mike for another errand, leaving Walt to clean alone. Angered, Walt then bribes 3 laundry workers into helping him clean the lab. Tyrus Kitt shows up and tells Walter he is sending the workers back to Honduras.

Jesse and Mike scout a drug house selling the blue meth from the hijacked truck, but Jesse grows impatient and tricks one of the meth users into letting him into the house, where he knocks out the other. Mike notices the words "¿Estás listo para platicar?" written on the stolen container, translating to "Are you ready to talk?". Gus meets with Mike at a diner that night and decides to try and negotiate with the cartel. Outside of the diner, Gus compliments Jesse's work in the missions with Mike, further boosting his self-esteem and loyalty.

Skyler returns home, but tells Walt to return the Dodge Challenger because it contradicts their cover story. She acknowledges that Walter Jr. will resent her, but coldly tells Walt that "someone has to protect this family from the man who protects this family".

Accolades 
Due to her nomination, Anna Gunn submitted this episode for consideration for the Primetime Emmy Award for Outstanding Supporting Actress in a Drama Series for the 64th Primetime Emmy Awards.

Although credited, Bob Odenkirk, Dean Norris and Betsy Brandt do not appear.

Reception 
The episode received very positive reviews from critics. Seth Amitin reviewing for IGN awarded the episode 9.5 out of 10 calling it an "extraordinary episode from top to bottom".  Alan Sepinwall of HitFix said the episode was his "favorite episode of season 4 to date". Donna Bowman of The A.V. Club gave the episode a "B+".
In 2019 The Ringer ranked "Cornered" as the 22nd best out of the 62 total Breaking Bad episodes.

References

External links 

 "Cornered" at the official Breaking Bad site
 

2011 American television episodes
Breaking Bad (season 4) episodes